Hard Rain is a live album by American singer-songwriter Bob Dylan, released on September 13, 1976 by Columbia Records. The album was recorded during the second leg of the Rolling Thunder Revue.

The album was partly recorded on May 23, 1976, during a concert at Hughes Stadium in Fort Collins, Colorado; the penultimate show of the tour, the concert was also filmed and broadcast by NBC as a one-hour television special in September. (Hard Rain'''s release coincided with this broadcast). Four tracks from the album ("I Threw It All Away," "Stuck inside of Mobile with the Memphis Blues Again," "Oh, Sister," and "Lay, Lady, Lay") were recorded on May 16, 1976 in Fort Worth, Texas. Neither the album nor the television special was well received.

"Although the band has been playing together longer, the charm has gone out of their exchanges," writes music critic Tim Riley. "Hard Rain...seemed to come at a time when the Rolling Thunder Revue, so joyful and electrifying in its first performances, had just plain run out of steam," wrote Janet Maslin, then a music critic for Rolling Stone. In his mixed review for Hard Rain, Robert Christgau criticized the Rolling Thunder Revue as "folkies whose idea of rock and roll is rock and roll clichés."

A representation of the earlier 1975 portion of the Rolling Thunder Revue was released in 2002 on The Bootleg Series Vol. 5: Bob Dylan Live 1975, The Rolling Thunder Revue. A more comprehensive 14-disc collection entitled Bob Dylan – The Rolling Thunder Revue: The 1975 Live Recordings was released in 2019 to coincide with the Netflix documentary-film Rolling Thunder Revue: A Bob Dylan Story by Martin Scorsese. 

Despite heavy promotion that placed it on the cover of TV Guide, NBC's television broadcast of the May 23rd concert drew disappointing ratings. Hard Rain'' eventually earned gold certification.

Track listing

Personnel
Bob Dylan - vocals, guitar, production

Additional musicians
Gary Burke - drums
T-Bone Burnett - guitar, piano
David Mansfield - guitar
Scarlet Rivera - strings
Mick Ronson - guitar on "Maggie's Farm"
Steven Soles - guitar, background vocals
Rob Stoner - bass, background vocals
Joan Baez - guitar, background vocals 
Howard Wyeth - drums, piano

Technical
Don DeVito - production
Don Meehan - recording and mixing engineering
Ken Regan - cover photo
Paula Scher - cover design
Lou Waxman - chief of tape research

Certifications

References

1976 live albums
Albums produced by Bob Dylan
Albums produced by Don DeVito
Bob Dylan live albums
Bob Dylan video albums
Columbia Records live albums
Columbia Records video albums